George Boyle (born 22 September 1996), better known by the stage name A'Whora, is a British drag queen from Worksop, England. He is best known for competing on the second series of RuPaul's Drag Race UK.

Education
Boyle studied for a diploma in womenswear and fashion at a college in Mansfield when he was 16, and graduated in 2013. In 2015, he moved to London to study at the London College of Fashion, where he earned a bachelor's degree in womenswear in 2018.

Career
Professionally, Boyle has fulfilled their career as a fashion designer and model by producing a sustainable 10 piece collection for H&M in 2015, working for Kurt Geiger and John Lewis & Partners, in addition to modelling for Vogue Italia and becoming the curator and founder of their own personal fashion label Le'Boy George.

In December 2020, A'Whora was announced as one of twelve contestants competing on the second series of RuPaul's Drag Race UK and placed fifth on the series overall. A'Whora will embark on a sold out UK Tour alongside Tayce, Bimini Bon Boulash and Lawrence Chaney for the United Kingdolls Tour with promoter Klub Kids in July 2021, and in February 2022 A'Whora will embark on RuPaul's Drag Race UK: The Official Tour alongside the entire cast of the second series of RuPaul's Drag Race UK, in association with World of Wonder and promoter Voss Events. In February 2021, A'Whora walked the runway at London Fashion Week alongside fellow series 2 contestant Bimini Bon-Boulash for London-based fashion brand Art School, designed by Eden Loweth.

Personal life
A'Whora currently resides in Streatham in South London, England and lives with fellow RuPaul's Drag Race UK contestant Tayce.

Filmography

Television

Web series

Music videos

Discography

As featured artist

Stage

References

External links

1996 births
Living people
20th-century English LGBT people
21st-century English LGBT people
English drag queens
Gay entertainers
People from Nottingham
People from Streatham
People from Worksop
RuPaul's Drag Race UK contestants